Ecobank Ghana is a commercial bank in Ghana. It is one of the commercial banks licensed by the Bank of Ghana, the national banking regulator.

Overview
EBG is a member of the Pan-African Ecobank chain which operates in thirty two (32) countries. The stock of Ecobank Ghana is listed on the Ghana Stock Exchange, where its shares are traded under the symbol EGH. The bank is a fully networked commercial bank in Ghana with branches (total of 77 as of December 2016) in almost all regions of the nation.

History
The bank was formed in 1990. In December 2011, Bank of Ghana, the central bank of the country, which also functions as the national banking regulator, gave approval for Ecobank Transnational to acquire 100% interest in The Trust Bank (TTB), another licensed commercial bank. At the time, the total asset valuation of TTB was approximately US$119 million (GH¢ 220 million). Ecobank has successfully merged TTB and EBG. The new bank is known as Ecobank Ghana Limited.

Awards 
CIMG Elite Category Hall of Fame (Under 10 Years) - 2019

See also

 Ecobank
 Ecobank Nigeria
 Ecobank Uganda
 Ecobank Zimbabwe
 List of banks in Ghana

References

External links
Ecobank Transnational Website

Ecobank Ghana at Africanselect

Banks of Ghana
Companies based in Accra
Banks established in 1990
Ghanaian companies established in 1990
Companies listed on the Ghana Stock Exchange